He or Ho is the romanized transliteration of several Chinese family names. According to a 2012 survey, 14 million people had Hé (何) listed as their surname, making it the 17th most common surname in Mainland China, a spot it retained in 2019. Hé was listed as the 21st most common surname in the Hundred Family Surnames, contained in the verse 何呂施張 (He Lü Shi Zhang). Other less common family names that are romanized as He include 河 (Pinyin: Hé), 佫 (Pinyin: Hè), 赫 (Pinyin: Hè), and 和.

A common alternative spelling of the surname is Ho, which is the Mandarin Wade-Giles romanization and the Cantonese romanization of the Chinese family names.

In the Korean language, the equivalent surname is Ha (하). In the Vietnamese language, the equivalent surname is Hà.

History 

The surname originates from the Ji clan of the Zhou Dynasty, and the Jiang clan of Yandi.
It was taken as a surname by the Sogdians when they came to China; therefore, it is considered to be one of the "Nine Sogdian Surnames."

Romanization

Notable people

Family name 何

Science and mathematics 
He Jifeng (何積豐), Chinese computer scientist
He Zehui (何泽慧), Chinese nuclear physicist
David Ho (scientist) (何大一), Chinese American AIDS researcher
Mae-Wan Ho (1941–2016), Hong Kong-born geneticist and biophysicist
Tin-Lun Ho (born 1951), Chinese-American theoretical physicist
Xuhua He (何旭华, born 1979), Chinese mathematician
He Zuoxiu, Chinese physicist and member of Chinese Academy of Sciences

Politics 
 Albert Ho (何俊仁), Hong Kong Legislative Council member with the Democratic Party
 Cyd Ho (何秀蘭), Hong Kong Legislative Council member with The Frontier
 Edmund Ho (何厚鏵), Chief Executive of the Macau Special Administrative Region of the People's Republic of China
 He Depu (何德普) dissident in the People's Republic of China
 Ho Chih-chin (何志欽), Minister of Finance of the Republic of China (2006-2008)
 Ho Chi-kung (何啟功), Deputy Minister of Health and Welfare of the Republic of China
 Ho Feng-Shan,  diplomat who saved a large number of Jews during World War II, known as "China's Schindler"
 Ho Mei-yueh (何美玥), Minister of the Council for Economic Planning and Development of the Republic of China (2007–2008)
 Ho Pei-shan (何佩珊), Deputy Secretary-General of the Executive Yuan of the Republic of China
 Hou Kok Chung (何国忠), Malaysian Deputy Minister for Higher Education

Finance 
He Qiaonü (何巧女) entrepreneur and philanthropist
Ho Kwon Ping, executive chairman of Banyan Tree Holdings
Ho Ching (何晶), executive director of Temasek Holdings and wife of Singapore prime minister Lee Hsien Loong
Robert Hotung (何東), Hong Kong businessman and philanthropist
Stanley Ho (何鴻燊), Hong Kong and Macau businessman

Filmography and entertainment 
Keishla He (何嘉裟), Puerto Rican social media personality
He Meitian (何美钿) Hong Kong actress and former gymnast
He Ping (director) (何平) Chinese film director
He Zhuoyan (何琢言), Chinese actress and singer
A. Kitman Ho (何傑民), Hong Kong-born American film producer
Denise Ho (何韻詩), Hong Kong singer and actress
Dennis Trillo (also known as Dennis Ho), Filipino actor
Don Ho (何大來), Hawaiian musician and entertainer.
Godfrey Ho, Hong Kong-based movie director best known for his Ninja films
Hoku Ho, American musician and actress
Josie Ho (何超儀), singer and actress from Hong Kong
Ho Ping (何平), Taiwanese film director
Daniel Ho, American musician, composer and producer specializing in Slack-key guitar, ukulele, and Hawaiian music.

Others 
He Kexin (何可欣), Chinese Olympic gymnast
He Pingping (何平平), one of the world's smallest men, from Inner Mongolia
He Qifang (何其芳), Chinese poet and essayist
Qiu Xia He (何秋霞), Chinese pipa player
He Xuntian (何训田), modern Chinese composer, famous for his compositions for Dadawa
He Yanwen (何 燕雯), Chinese female rower
He Ying (何影), Chinese athlete and archer
He Yingqin (何應欽), senior Kuomintang general
He Yong (rock musician) (何勇), Chinese rock musician
He Zhi Wen (何誌文), Chinese-born Spanish male table tennis player
Ho Fuk Yan (何福仁), teacher, Chinese language author and poet in Hong Kong
Sui He (何穗) Chinese fashion model
He Luli (何鲁丽) Chinese doctor and politician
He Bingjiao (何冰娇) Chinese badminton player
Siobhan Haughey (何詩蓓) Hong Kong swimmer

See also
List of common Chinese surnames

References

External links
Chinese surname history: He

Chinese-language surnames
Multiple Chinese surnames